Demirtepe is a village in the Nusaybin District of Mardin Province in Turkey. The village had a population of 207 in 2021.

References 

Villages in Nusaybin District
Kurdish settlements in Mardin Province